Amsterdam Impressionism was an art movement in late 19th-century Holland. It is associated especially with George Hendrik Breitner and is also known as the School of Allebé.

The innovative ideas about painting of the French Impressionists were introduced into the Netherlands by the artists of the Hague School. This new style of painting was also adopted in Amsterdam by the young generation of artists of the late 19th century. Like their French colleagues, these Amsterdam painters put their impressions onto canvas with rapid, visible strokes of the brush. They focused on depicting the everyday life of the city.

Origins
Breitner studied for four-and-a-half years at the Royal Academy, The Hague and came into contact with artists of the Hague School such as Jozef Israëls, Jacob Maris and Anton Mauve, joining the Pulchri Studio. Nevertheless his painting style was always too free to be realist in nature, a hallmark of the Hague School. In 1884 he moved briefly to Paris, coming into contact with impressionism, and on his return he settled in Amsterdam where he became noted for his free and energetic depictions of urban life.

Other Amsterdam Impressionists were Floris Verster, Isaac Israëls, Willem Bastiaan Tholen, Kees Heynsius, Willem de Zwart, Willem Witsen and Jan Toorop, the last an associate of the Belgian painter James Ensor and a member of the Brussels Les XX. Also included in the movement are a group of late-impressionist woman artists called the Amsterdamse Joffers, whose members included Lizzy Ansingh and Suze Bisschop-Robertson.

Artists
This artists belong to the 2. generation of the Netherlands Impressionism. The Influence of their work was important on the subsequent movement of modern art in the 20th century.

 Pieter Florentius Nicolaas Jacobus Arntzenius (1864-1925)
 Johan Braakensiek (1858-1940)
 Nicolaas Bastert (1854-1939)
 Cornelius de Bruin (1870-1940)
 George Hendrik Breitner (1857-1923)
 Dirk van Haaren (1878-1953)
 Kees Heynsius (1890-1981)
 Richard Roland Holst (1868-1938)
 Isaac Israëls (1865-1934)
 Hendrik Maarten Krabbé (1868-1931)
 Jacobus van Looy (1855-1930)
 Johan Thorn Prikker (1868-1932)
 Hobbe Smith (1862-1942)
 Willem Bastiaan Tholen (1860-1931) 
 Johannes Theodorus Toorop (1858-1928)
 Floris Verster (1864-1925)
 Jan Hillebrand Wijsmuller (1855-1925)
 Willem Witsen (1860-1923)
 Willem de Zwart (1862-1931)

Gallery

Amsterdamse Joffers
 Lizzy Ansingh (1875–1959)
 Jo Bauer-Stumpff (1873–1951)
 Ans van den Berg (1873–1942)
 Nelly Bodenheim (1874–1951)
 Marie van Regteren Altena (1868–1958)
 Jacoba Johanna (Coba) Ritsema (1876–1961)
 Suze Bisschop-Robertson (1855–1922)
 Thérèse Schwartze (1851–1918)
 Jacoba Surie (1879–1970)
 Betsy Westendorp-Osieck (1880–1968)

The following female artist had contact to the Amsterdamse Joffers:

 Elsa van Doesenburg (1875–1957)
 Josepha Johanna Julia Marie Tepe (1884–1962)

Gallery of Amsterdamse Joffers

References

Art movements in Dutch painting
Impressionism